Michael Leonard (born 26 March 2004) is a Canadian racing cyclist, who currently rides for UCI WorldTeam .

Career
In 2021 while racing for Toronto Hustle Team Development he came second overall at the Tour du Léman Juniors. Leonard moved to Team Franco Ballerini Juniors at the start of the 2022 season. In August he once again rode the Tour du Léman Juniors this time winning the overall. On 22 September 2022 it was announced that Leonard would join  on a three-year contract from 2023.

Major results
Sources:

2021
 1st Trofee Maarten Wynants Juniors
 2nd Overall Tour du Léman Juniors
 2nd Langemark Madonna
 2nd GP Metaalwaren Rosseel
 2nd Sint-Lambrechts-Herk
 8th Mol Ezaart
 10th Balegem
2022
 1st  Overall Tour du Léman Juniors
1st Stage 2
 1st Ballero Nel Cuore
 1st Trofeo Sopegu
 1st Gran Premio Boncellino Cronometro
 1st Gran Premio Bermac Gara
 1st Memorial Paolo Batignani
 1st Trofeo Madonna del Cavatore
 2nd Trofeo Vivaldo Cipollini
 3rd Coppa Giulio Burci Juniors
 4th Giro di Primavera
 5th Trofeo Biondi Alessandro Alla Memoria
 5th Coppa Pietro Linari
 6th GP Neri Sottoli.it
 8th Giro della Castellania
 10th Overall Trofeo Buffoni Juniors 
 10th Trofeo Conad Monsummano Terme

References

External links

2004 births
Living people
Canadian male cyclists
21st-century Canadian people